Piñan, officially the Municipality of Piñan (Subanen: Benwa Piñan; Chavacano: Municipalidad de Piñan), is a fourth-class municipality in the province of Zamboanga del Norte, Philippines. According to the 2020 census, it has a population of 20,221 people.

It is also known as New Piñan.

Etymology

Piñan came from a Subano term pinyayan which means tabuan (trading place). Before it was established as a formal settlement, this place has been a trading point between natives to the area and ambulant peddlers. In 1903, Captain Finley, a military governor in Zamboanga, established a tabuan in what is now known as Barangay Del Pilar. The tabuan became known as Piñan, and when the municipality was created it was called New Piñan to differentiate it from Piñan.

Another version states that Piñan got its name from the native word piña, a pineapple fruit that grows abundantly in this locality. Vast tracts of pineapple plantations can be seen all over the area. Because of abundance of piña fruits, natives called the place Piñan.

The name of the municipality of New Piñan was later changed to Piñan under Republic Act No. 2846 on June 19, 1960.

History 
The inhabitants of Piñan were engaged in farming. They cultivated their field by using the “kaingin” system, in which the land was cleared by setting fire to woody plant and bushes, after which holes were bored in the ground with pointed sticks and seeds were planted. They also used wooden plows and harrows drawn by carabaos. Then, Piñan became the source of farm production using their famous horse- or cattle-driven caretelas, and people from neighboring municipalities began coming to Piñan to purchase agricultural products and establish tabuan.

Piñan acquired its juridical personality on August 22, 1951, by virtue of Executive Order No. 467 by President of the Philippines Elpedio Quirino, and an act creating the municipality of Piñan, from the municipality of Dipolog. Piñan was inaugurated through the effort of Serapio J. Datoc, who was at the time, the Governor of the province of Zamboanga (with the north portion now the province of Zamboanga del Norte), and declared as an independent municipality separate from its mother municipality of Dipolog (now city of Dipolog.)

Geography

Barangays
Piñan is politically subdivided into 22 barangays.

Climate

Demographics

Economy

References

External links
 Piñan Profile at PhilAtlas.com
 [ Philippine Standard Geographic Code]
Philippine Census Information

Municipalities of Zamboanga del Norte
Establishments by Philippine executive order